The 2015–16 TCU Horned Frogs men's basketball team represented Texas Christian University in the 2015–16 NCAA Division I men's basketball season, led by head coach Trent Johnson in his fourth and final season at TCU. The Horned Frogs were members of the Big 12 Conference and played their home games at Schollmaier Arena, which reopened in December after a $72 million upgrade. Some early season, non-conference games were played in the TCU University Recreation Center and the Wilkerson-Greines Activity Center while construction on Schollmaier Arena was completed. The Horned Frogs finished the season 12–21, 2–16 in Big 12 play to finish in last place. They defeated Texas Tech in the first round of the Big 12 tournament to advance to the quarterfinals where they lost to West Virginia.

On March 14, head coach Trent Johnson was fired. He finished at TCU with a four-year record of 50–79.

Previous season 
In 2014–15, the Horned Frogs started the season 14–0, climbing to #25 in national polls. The Frogs went on to finish the 2014–15 season with a record of 18–15 (4–14, Big 12), and advanced to the quarterfinals of the Big 12 tournament, where they fell to the Kansas Jayhawks.

Personnel

Departures

Incoming Transfers

Recruiting

Roster

Roster Source: GoFrogs.com

Schedule

|-
!colspan=9 style="background:#4d1979; color:#FFFFFF;"| Regular season

|-
!colspan=9 style="background:#4d1979; color:#FFFFFF;"| Big 12 tournament

Schedule Source: GoFrogs.com

Awards
Vladimir Brodziansky
Big 12 Newcomer of the Week (week 1)

References

See also
 Big 12 men's basketball tournament
 2015–16 TCU Horned Frogs women's basketball team
 TCU Athletics
 Schollmaier Arena

Tcu
TCU Horned Frogs men's basketball seasons